The 7th constituency of Seine-et-Marne is a French legislative constituency in the Seine-et-Marne département.

Description

The 7th constituency of Seine-et-Marne lies in the north of the department.

The seat was held by the right from 1993 when it was captured in the conservative landslide by Charles Cova of the RPR until the LREM landslide of 2017. At the 2012 election Yves Albarello of the conservative UMP held the seat by less than one hundred votes over his Socialist opponent.

Historic Representation

Election results

2022

 
 
 
 
 
 
 
|-
| colspan="8" bgcolor="#E9E9E9"|
|-

2017

 
 
 
 
 
 
 
 
|-
| colspan="8" bgcolor="#E9E9E9"|
|-

2012

 
 
 
 
 
|-
| colspan="8" bgcolor="#E9E9E9"|
|-

2007

 
 
 
 
 
 
 
|-
| colspan="8" bgcolor="#E9E9E9"|
|-

2002

 
 
 
 
 
 
|-
| colspan="8" bgcolor="#E9E9E9"|
|-

1997

 
 
 
 
 
 
 
 
|-
| colspan="8" bgcolor="#E9E9E9"|
|-

Sources

Official results of French elections from 2002: "Résultats électoraux officiels en France" (in French).

7